Hippolochus was a Macedonian writer, a student of Theophrastus, who addressed to his fellow-student Lynceus of Samos a description of a wedding feast in Macedon in the early 3rd century BC. The bridegroom was a certain Caranus, probably a relative of the Caranus who had been a companion of Alexander the Great. The letter survives because it is quoted at length by Athenaeus in the Deipnosophistae.

References
Athenaeus, The Deipnosophists, Book 4.
Andrew Dalby, "Hippolochus: The wedding feast of Caranus the Macedonian" in Petits propos culinaires no. 29 (1988) pp. 37–45. Reprinted in The wilder shores of gastronomy ed. Alan Davidson, Helen Saberi (Berkeley, California: Ten Speed Press, 2002) pp. 288–297.

Ancient Macedonian writers
Ancient Greek food writers
3rd-century BC Macedonians
Culture of Macedonia (ancient kingdom)
Year of birth unknown
Year of death unknown